This is a list of notable events in country music that took place in the year 1928.

Events 
 "The first edition of Bradley Kincaid's 1928 songbook called My Favorite Mountain Ballads sold more than 100,000 copies;[1]

Top Hillbilly (Country) Recordings

The following songs were extracted from records included in Joel Whitburn's Pop Memories 1890-1954, record sales reported on the "Discography of American Historical Recordings" website, and other sources as specified.Numerical rankings are approximate, they are only used as a frame of reference.

Births 
 March 31 – Lefty Frizzell, honky-tonk singer-songwriter (died 1975).
 April 3 – Don Gibson, singer-songwriter who rose to fame in the late 1950s through late 1970s (died 2003).
 May 3 – Dave Dudley, singer best known for his truck-driving anthems ("Six Days on the Road") (died 2003).
 August 10 – Jimmy Dean, singer-songwriter best known for "Big Bad John" and other 1960s ballads; television host and businessman/founder of eponymously named sausage company (died 2010).
 December 17 – George Lindsey, comedian-actor who played Goober Pyle on television's The Andy Griffith Show and Hee Haw (died 2012).

Deaths

Further reading 
 Kingsbury, Paul, "Vinyl Hayride: Country Music Album Covers 1947–1989," Country Music Foundation, 2003
 Millard, Bob, "Country Music: 70 Years of America's Favorite Music," HarperCollins, New York, 1993
 Whitburn, Joel. "Top Country Songs 1944–2005 – 6th Edition." 2005.

Notes
1. ^ a b c d e f Bradley Kincaid, Nashville Songwriters Foundation Hall of Fame. Accessed 25 August 2007.

References

Country
Country music by year